De Leede is a Dutch surname. Notable people with the surname include:

 Babette de Leede (born 1999), Dutch cricketer and cousin of Bas
 Bas de Leede (born 1999), Dutch cricketer, son of Tim and cousin of Babette
 Tim de Leede (born 1968), Dutch cricketer, father of Bas

Dutch-language surnames